Much Ado About Nothing is a 2016 Chilean drama film directed by Alejandro Fernández Almendras. It was shown in the Panorama section at the 66th Berlin International Film Festival.

It was inspired by a real-life political scandal in Chile. In 2013, Martín Larraín, son of Senator Carlos Larraín (then-president of the right-wing party Renovación Nacional), was acquitted after killing a man in a DUI hit and run while his friends took the fall.

Plot
Vicente, who resides in Los Angeles, returns to Chile to spend his summer at his parents' beach house. He is a reckless and somewhat solitary young man. However, one of those typical nights of pursuing girls and having drinks alters his life forever; he becomes the prime suspect in a hit-and-run accident that results in the death of a local fisherman. "I wasn't the one driving," he insists, but his memories are muddled. He does recall being in the car and that the driver was the son of a powerful politician.

Cast
 Agustín Silva as Vicente "Vicho" Maldonado
 Samuel Landea as Manuel Larrea
 Paulina García as Roxana
 Alejandro Goic as Uncle Julio
 Daniel Alcaíno as Prosecutor Yáñez
 Augusto Schuster as Diego
 Pilar Ronderos as Camila
 Geraldine Neary as Francisca
 Isabella Costa as Ana
 Victoria de Gregorio as Sofía
 Li Fridman as Lucía
 Mariana di Girólamo as María
 Luis Gnecco as Gustavo Barría

References

External links
 

2016 films
2016 drama films
Chilean drama films
2010s Spanish-language films
Drama films based on actual events
Films about miscarriage of justice
2010s Chilean films